Tower Hamlets Football Club is a football club based in the London Borough of Tower Hamlets.

History
Bethnal Green United was established in 2000 by Mohammed Nurul Hoque and Akhtar Ahmed as a community club. The club played in several leagues, including the Canary Wharf Summer League, the Inner London Football League and the London Intermediate League, before joining the Middlesex County League. They were granted Senior status after winning the league's Premier Division in 2009, and were promoted to the Essex Senior League. In the 2009–10 season they finished fifth in the ESL and won both cups operated by the Essex Senior League, beating Burnham Ramblers 4–1 in the final of the Gordon Brasted Memorial Trophy. 

In 2013, the club was renamed to Tower Hamlets. During the 1990s, an unrelated club, also by the name of Tower Hamlets, played at the Mile End Stadium. At the end of the 2019–20 season, the club were transferred to the Premier Division of the Southern Counties East League after moving to Phoenix Sports' ground in Barnehurst from the Mile End Stadium. The 2021–22 season saw Tower Hamlets finish bottom of the league and suffer relegation to step 6 however there was still uncertainty as to which league they would be playing in.

Ground
In 2008, the club moved from Meath Gardens in Bethnal Green to the Mile End Stadium. In 2020, Tower Hamlets moved to the Phoenix Sports Ground in Barnehurst.

Honours

Essex Senior League
League Cup winners 2009–10
Gordon Brasted Memorial Trophy winners 2009–10
Middlesex County League
Premier Division champions 2008–09
Premier Division Cup winners 2007–08
Middlesex County Open Cup
Winners 2008–09
Tower Hamlets League
Champions 2002–03
League Cup winners 2002–03
 Tower Hamlet's Mayors Cup
Winners 2012

Records
Best FA Cup performance: First qualifying round, 2010–11
Best FA Vase performance: Fifth round, 2011–12
Record attendance: 468 vs Clapton, Essex Senior League, 25 August 2017

See also

Football in London

References

External links
Club website

Football clubs in England
Football clubs in London
Essex Senior Football League
Association football clubs established in 2000
2000 establishments in England
Sport in the London Borough of Tower Hamlets
Middlesex County Football League
Southern Counties East Football League